Slieve Commedagh is a mountain with a height of 767 m (2,516 ft) in County Down, Northern Ireland. It is the second-highest of the Mourne Mountains, after Slieve Donard, and the second-highest mountain in Northern Ireland.

Slieve Commedagh lies to the northwest of Slieve Donard, and the two are linked by a col. The Mourne Wall passes east-west over the mountaintop, and there is a small one-room tower at the summit. There is also the remains of an ancient burial cairn on the summit. On its southern side is a group of granite tors known as 'the Castles'.

The Slieve Commedagh massif also includes the summits of Slievecorragh (to the east), Shan Slieve, Slievenamaddy and Slievenabrock (to the north).

Gallery

See also
List of mountains in Ireland

References

Hewitts of Northern Ireland
Marilyns of Northern Ireland
Mountains and hills of County Down
Mountains under 1000 metres